Sir Arthur Lewis Community College is the only community college in the island country of Saint Lucia. The college was established in 1985 and is named after Saint Lucian economist and Nobel laureate Sir Arthur Lewis.

Notable alumni
Sarah Flood-Beaubrun, former Member of Parliament and Government Minister
Gale Rigobert, Member of Parliament for Micoud North
Bebiana Mangal, Miss St. Lucia 2019

References

External links
website

Buildings and structures in Castries
Universities and colleges in Saint Lucia
Educational institutions established in 1985
Community colleges
1985 establishments in Saint Lucia